Masters W45 javelin world record progression is the progression of world record improvements of the javelin throw W45 division of Masters athletics.  Records must be set in properly conducted, official competitions under the standing IAAF rules unless modified by World Masters Athletics.

The W45 division consists of female athletes who have reached the age of 45 but have not yet reached the age of 50, so exactly from their 45th birthday to the day before their 50th birthday. The W45 division throws exactly the same 600 g implement as the Open division.  These competitors all threw their records in open competition.

Key

Old javelin

References

Masters Athletics Javelin list

Masters athletics world record progressions
Javelin